Brychius elevatus is a species of beetle in the genus Brychius that was first described by Panzer in 1793.

References

Haliplidae
Beetles described in 1793